Chris Barrows (born Wichita, Kansas) is an American vocalist and songwriter best known as frontman of the punk band Pink Lincolns.  Barrows co-founded The Pink Lincolns in 1986 in Tampa, Florida, quickly becoming known for his "trademark snotty humor" and stage antics.  Still active in Florida, the band has released a number of albums and EPs including splits such as Screeching Weasel/Pink Lincolns Split and Live At Some Prick's House with The Queers. In 1998 Barrows released one album as vocalist of the group The Jackie Papers, and in 2009 he released the album Shove while vocalist of the punk group The Spears. His debut solo album, Human Being, will be released by 24 Hour Service Station on September 9, 2014.

Music career

1986-97: Founding Pink Lincolns

Chris Barrows was born in Wichita, Kansas, and later moved to Tampa, Florida. He first started his music career as vocalist of the local punk group Pink Lincolns, which he co-founded with guitarist Dorsey Martin.  Barrows had first met Dorsey while hanging out with the local punk band Not Much; Barrows was friends with their guitarist, and Dorsey was in the band as well. The rest of the Pink Lincoln's lineup has frequently changed and currently includes bassist Kevin Coss and drummer Jeff Fox, who joined in 2005.

Their first album was "Back From The Pink Room", released in 1987. The band has since released four more studio albums, one live album and six EP's as well as splits with Screeching Weasel and The Queers.  The band's track have appeared on over 20 compilations from labels like Lookout, Stiff Pole and Choking Hazard.

About their later EP Sumo Fumes, released in 1993, Miami New Times wrote "opening the slab of wax is a raucous rendition of Wire's "Ex-Lion Tamer" that is somehow better and completely owned in the hands of this band... This is followed by the pure rock and roll snot of "Tarzan #2" where they assert themselves with an original take on Edgar Rice Burrough's canon. The band closes out the B-side with another cover, this time of the Psychedelic Furs; 'Pretty in Pink.'"

The cover for the band's 1994 album Suck and Bloat was drawn by Iggy Pop, and their 1997 album Pure Swank was produced by Bill Stevenson of The Descendents. Notable songs include "Velvet Elvis", a story about a squabble over a velvet painting of Elvis Presley.

1998: The Jackie Papers
Around 1998 Barrows took a break from Pink Lincolns and founded the band The Jackie Papers in Florida. Beyond Barrows on vocals and guitar, there was Jenny Page on guitar, Heidi Flanigan on bass and vocals, and Heather Now on drums. About The Jackie Papers, Miami New Times wrote that "while it can be argued that the music is similar to The Pink Lincolns, there is without a doubt a stronger hardcore edge...chockfull of Barrows' trademark snotty humor."

In September 1998 the band recorded their only album at Morrisound Studios along with producer Steve Heritage. Mixing was handled by Bill Stevenson and Stephen Egerton. About their album Uckfay Ooyay, released that year on Stiff Pole Records, Miami New Times wrote, "The midsection of the album is an instrumental piece titled 'Coolio Iglesias' that is pretty cool and sloppy garage rock with metal tinges. Their cover of Screeching Weasel's 'Hey Suburbia' is amped-up in a slightly more hardcore vein. 'Addiction' does a good job of Heidi's vocals and it comes off as a creepy intersection of L7 and The Breeders."

2005-09: Pink Lincolns albums
After an eight year hiatus from studio recording, the Pink Lincolns got together and recorded the original album No Lo Siento in 2004. It was their last studio recording, and released in 2005 on Hazzard Records. Bill Stevenson produced. Afterwards several of their albums were remastered and released by Jailhouse, starting with Back From The Pink Room in 2008 and Suck And Bloat in 2009, both released on vinyl and CD.

About when they release album, and their habit of not syncing tours with album releases, Barrows has stated, "We got back together and had new stuff so we were going to do an album. When we have an album's worth of shit, we'll do it. We're on our own schedule. We don't have to put out an album every year whether it sucks or not, ya know. We just.... when we have shit we wanna do, we do it."

2007-09: The Spears
On September 15, 2009 he released the album Shove as part of the  punk group The Spears, which he co-founded around 2007 Signed to Jailhouse Records, The Spears lineup consisted of Barrows on vocals, Sam Williams (Down By Law) on guitar, Gary Strickland (vocalist of Hated Youth) on bass, and Rob Rampy (D.R.I.) on drums. A remastered version of Shove was released in 2013.

2012-14: Yinz and Human Being
In 2012 the Pink Lincolns released their first live album on 24 Hour Service Station.  Recorded live at Pittsburgh's 31st Street Pub on April 21, 2005,  Yinz: The Live Album has a lineup featuring bassist Kevin Coss and drummer Jeff Fox. Among many of their original tracks, the album includes a cover of Flipper's "Sex Bomb."

Barrows' first solo album, Human Being, is due out September 9, 2014 on 24 Hour Service Station. The album features guest vocals by Ben Weasel of Screeching Weasel on the track "Not It," while The Dwarves' He Who Cannot Be Named contributes Farfisa organ to the track "Be My Girl" and "Human Being." Among the tracks are "Champs," are cover of the Wire song from the Pink Flag album, with Lianna Hoffman contributing cello.

Style and equipment
According to Jailhouse Records, "Although frequently lumped into the pop punk category, many fans identify [Pink Lincolns] as hardcore, which given Chris Barrows stage antics, insanely rowdy shows and almost famously raucous crowds over the years, the hardcore label definitely seems appropriate."

Discography

Solo material

With Pink Lincolns

Albums
1988: Back From the Pink Room
1989: Headache
1994: Suck and Bloat
1997: Pure Swank
2005: No Lo Siento
2012: Yinz: The Live Album

EPs
1987: Cotton Mather
1989: Tragedy for Tea Free
1993: Sumo Fumes
1995: Sumo Fumes 2
1995: V.M. Live
1996: Sumo Fumes 3

Split EPs
1993: Screeching Weasel/Pink Lincolns Split (with Screeching Weasel)
1994: Live At Some Prick's House (with The Queers)
1997: Submachine/Pink Lincolns Split (with Submachine)

With The Jackie Papers

With The Spears

Guest appearances

Further reading
Interviews and reviews

Discographies
Chris Barrows at Allmusic
Chris Barrows at Discogs

See also
Pink Lincolns

References

External links
Pink Lincolns at 24 Hour Service Station
The Spears on Facebook

Living people
Musicians from Tampa, Florida
Year of birth missing (living people)
Musicians from Wichita, Kansas
Writers from Wichita, Kansas